Ersenoy (Ersana)  is a rural locality (a selo) in Vedensky District, Chechnya.

Administrative and municipal status 
Municipally, Ersenoy is incorporated as Ersenoyskoye rural settlement. It is the administrative center of the municipality and the only settlement included in it.

Geography 

Ersenoy is located on the left bank of the Gums River.

The nearest settlements to Ersenoy are Tazen-Kala in the south-east, Dyshne-Vedeno, Vedeno and Zelamkhin-Kotar in the south-west, Agishbatoy and Mesedoy in the north-west, and Nizhny Kurchali and Sredny Kurchali in the north-east.

History 
In 1944, after the genocide and deportation of the Chechen and Ingush people and the Chechen-Ingush ASSR was abolished, the village of Ersenoy was renamed to Kidero, and settled by people from the neighboring republic of Dagestan. From 1944 to 1957, it was a part of the Vedensky District of the Dagestan ASSR.

In 1958, after the Vaynakh people returned and the Chechen-Ingush ASSR was restored, the village regained its old Chechen name, Ersana.

Population 
 2002 Census: 302
 2010 Census: 420
 2019 estimate: 460

According to the results of the 2010 Census, the majority of residents of Ersenoy were ethnic Chechens. The majority of the village's population are from the Ersenoy teip.

References 

Rural localities in Vedensky District